Code Page 1019 (CCSID 1019), also known as CP1019, is the code page for the Dutch version of ISO 646. It is roughly equivalent to ASCII, differing only in replacing the tilde with a macron.

It should not be confused with the significantly different Code page 1102, which also complies with the ISO 646 invariant structure, and is the Dutch version of DEC's National Replacement Character Set (NRCS).

Codepage layout

See also
 Code page 1102

References

1019
Dutch language